The Wissel Lakes tree frog (Litoria wisselensis) is a species of frog in the subfamily Pelodryadinae, endemic to West Papua, Indonesia. Its natural habitats are freshwater lakes, intermittent freshwater lakes, and rocky areas.

References

Litoria
Amphibians of Western New Guinea
Amphibians described in 1968
Taxonomy articles created by Polbot